Irondale is the name of several places in the United States:
Irondale, Alabama
Irondale, Georgia
Irondale, Missouri
Irondale, New York
Irondale, Ohio
Irondale, Washington
Irondale Township, Minnesota
In Canada:
Irondale, Ontario
Irondale River (Ontario)

Irondale is also the name of a school in New Brighton, Minnesota: Irondale High School.